Edelen is a surname. Notable people with the surname include:

Buddy Edelen (1937–1997), American marathoner
Ed Edelen (1912–1982), American baseball player
Joe Edelen (born 1955), American baseball player
Rollin Edelen (1908–1993), American businessman and politician
Walter E. Edelen (1911–1991), American politician and businessman